Stine Pettersen Reinås (born 15 July 1994) is a Norwegian football defender who currently plays for Toppserien side Stabæk.

She hails from Hafslo, and lived in Sogndal where she started her senior career in Kaupanger IL at the age of 15. Ahead of the 2011 season she signed for second-tier FBK Voss, but already in mid-2011 she moved to Trondheim and Kattem IL. Ahead of the 2013 season she went on to Stabæk. In December 2017 Reinås went to Vålerenga.

In 2016, she made her debut for the Norway women's national football team, scoring one goal in the 10–0 victory over Kazakhstan.

International goals

References

1994 births
Living people
People from Luster, Norway
Norwegian women's footballers
Kattem IL players
Stabæk Fotball Kvinner players
Vålerenga Fotball Damer players
Toppserien players
Norway women's youth international footballers
Norway women's international footballers
Women's association football defenders
Sportspeople from Vestland
UEFA Women's Euro 2017 players